This Is What You Get may refer to:

 This Is What You Get (The Arrogant Sons of Bitches album), 2006
 This Is What You Get (Flunk album), 2009